The petroleum fly, Helaeomyia petrolei, is a species of fly from California, USA. The larvae feed on dead insects and other arthropods that become trapped in naturally occurring petroleum pools, making this the only known insect species that develops in crude oil, a substance which is normally highly toxic to insects.

Description
Adults are about 5 mm long, with black bodies, except for lighter cheeks. The halteres are yellowish, with white knobs. The densely hairy eyes are nearest at the middle of the face. The third joint of the antennae is slightly longer than the second, the spine of the latter not reaching beyond the apex of the antennae. The hyaline wings are tinged with gray on nearly the entire costal half, except sometimes having a spot toward the apex of the submarginal cell. The apex of the second vein is nearly twice as far from the first as from the apex of the third vein.

Biology
While the larvae normally swim slowly near the surface of the oil with the tips of their air-tubes showing as minute points above the surface film, they are able to submerge for longer periods. The mating behavior and egg deposition are still not described, but it is thought that the eggs are not laid inside the oil. The larvae leave it only to pupate, travelling to nearby grass stems on the margins of the pool. Their whole development between newly hatched larva and pupa takes place exclusively in petroleum.

Petroleum tolerance

The larvae ingest large quantities of oil and asphalt, and their guts can be seen to be filled with petroleum. However, nutritional experiments showed that they subsist on animal matter present in the oil, which they quickly devour. Oil fly larvae contain about 200,000 heterotrophic bacteria, which have been of interest to scientists searching for microorganisms or enzymes that function in an organic solvent environment. The nitrogen-rich nutrients released into the gut make the environment, with a pH of around 6.5, suitable for the development of these bacteria. There is no evidence that these bacteria contribute to insect physiology.

William Homan Thorpe referred to H. petrolei as "undoubtedly one of the chief biological curiosities of the world."

Distribution
The petroleum fly was first described in crude petroleum of the La Brea Tar Pits near Los Angeles, California, although the maggots were known to petroleum technologists many years earlier. The population is not considered endangered. The species has since been found in other locations, where the populations are considered sporadic.

See also
 Eufriesia purpurata, a bee that collects DDT

References

Ephydridae
Diptera of North America
Endemic fauna of California
Insects described in 1899
Taxa named by Daniel William Coquillett
Environmental impact of the petroleum industry
Fauna without expected TNC conservation status